Dulce Domum (lit. Sweetly at Home) is a tune composed by Robert Ambrose in 1876. This phrase is used as the title of The Wind In The Willows Chapter 5.

Songs using this tune
 "One Sweetly Solemn Thought" by Phoebe Cary

External links
 - Information from Christian Classics Ethereal Hymnary, including full score and MIDI versions
 Information from Cyberhymnal

1876 songs